The educational system in Nepal was long based on home-schooling and gurukulas. This was similar to the former Indian system of education, in which the pupils would learn either in their homes or with reputed priests or Gurus. Before Nepal was declared a democratic country, the general public had no access to formal education. The first formal school, Durbar High School, established by Jung Bahadur Rana in 1853, was intended for the elite. The birth of Nepalese democracy in 1951 opened its classrooms to a more diverse population. Education in Nepal from the primary school to the university level has been modeled from the very inception on the Indian system, which is in turn the legacy of the old British Raj.

Nepal
's 1971 education plan hastened its development in the country. In around1952/54 Nepal had 10,000 students in 300 schools and an adult literacy rate of five percent.  There were 49,000 schools in 2010, and by 2015 the overall adult literacy rate was 63.9 percent (males 76.4 percent and females 53.1 percent). It has already been more than half-decade that public schools started imparting the education in the country.

The Human Rights Measurement Initiative (HRMI) finds that Nepal is fulfilling only 83.5% of what it should be fulfilling for the right to education based on the country's level of income. HRMI breaks down the right to education by looking at the rights to both primary education and secondary education. While taking into consideration Nepal's income level, the nation is achieving 95.4% of what should be possible based on its resources (income) for primary education but only 71.5% for secondary education.

Administration

The Ministry of Education is responsible for managing educational activities in Nepal. The Minister of Education (assisted by the state or assistant minister) is the political leader of the ministry. The ministry, as a part of the government, is headed by the Secretary of Education and consists of a central national office and other offices at the regional and district levels. The central office is primarily responsible for policy development, planning, monitoring, and evaluation.

The ministry has established directorates in each of the five development regions and education offices in each of Nepal's 76 districts to bring educational administration to the people. These decentralized offices are responsible for overseeing local informal and school-level educational activities. Regional directorates are primarily responsible for coordinating, monitoring and evaluating educational activities, and the district education offices provide services.

The National Center for Educational Development (NCED) is Nepal's teacher-training body. It has 34 educational training centers (ETCs) to provide pedagogical support for teachers.

Nepal has two primary types of schools: community and institutional. Community (public) schools receive government grants, and institutional (private) schools are self-funded. Institutional schools are non-profit trusts or companies.

With one exception, all universities and academies are publicly managed and supported by public funding. Public universities also provide affiliation to private colleges. Academies of higher education are typically single-college institutes, and universities have constituent and affiliated colleges across Nepal.

Structure

Primary education in Nepal called Basic Education consists of grades one through eight. Secondary levels are grades nine to twelve. Pre-primary education is available in some areas, and students usually begin grade one at age five. A Basic Level Examination (BLE), previously known as District Level Examination (DLE), is given on grade eight while a national Secondary Education Exam (SEE), previously known as School Leaving Certificate (SLC), is examination is conducted at the end of grade 10, while completing the Grade 12 examination leads to the School Leaver's Certificate. The National Examinations Board (NEB) supervises all BLE, SEE and 12th grade exams.

University education leads successfully to the degrees of bachelor, master and doctor (PhD). Depending upon the educational stream and degree subject, a bachelor's degree may require as much as three to five years of study, but two years is the typical duration. Some universities offer M.Phil. and post-graduate diplomas.

Vocational education begins after lower secondary education, and students can follow a two-year curriculum leading to a Technical School Leaving Certificate. Universities also offer professional and technical degrees. In addition to the formal track, one-year programs focusing on skills development are also available. The District Level Examination is given in grade eight. The new educational system has two levels: basic (grades one through eight) and secondary (grades nine through twelve).

Crisis and illiteracy 
Although the Jhapa District has 99.33% literate in 2014 many children in remote villages do not have access to education past the primary level. Sociologists have identified the Chepang people the "poorest of the poor" in Nepal. Students often leave primary schools after they learn to read and write, but without any additional education. The April 2015 earthquake destroyed schools and severely impacted the nation's ability to keep its remaining schools open.

Textbooks

Government schools use Janak textbooks, and private schools use reference books. Government schools perform poorly in the SLC exam, presently SEE exam, due to the lack of skilled teachers, textbooks, and the Ministry of Education's neglect of textbook reform.

Tertiary education

Universities
Nepal's first college was Tri-Chandra College, founded in 1918. Until 1985, Tribhuvan University was the country's only university. During the early 1980s, the government developed the concept of a multi-university system in which each school would have its own nature, content, and function.

The first new university was Mahendra Sanskrit University. It was followed by Kathmandu University (the first university, initiated from a private side) in 1990 and Purbanchal and Pokhara Universities in 1995 and 1996, respectively.

Medical colleges
Medical colleges, mostly private, exist throughout Nepal. Local students are admitted after an entrance exam, and foreign students are admitted after an interview. To be eligible for admission to MBBS courses in Nepal's medical colleges, students must pass the higher secondary examination in science or its equivalent.
Medical education is regulated by the Medical Council of Nepal. In addition to accrediting the country's medical colleges, the council conducts the licensing examination for new doctors, makes policies related to curriculum, admission, terms and examinations and makes registration recommendations.

Medical education in Nepal is highly controversial as many qualified students are turned away in lieu of competitive marks. Corruption is rampant with schools accepting students based on connections to established figures or illicit donations made to the school. The "hidden" tuition, as it's referred, is the additional cost of bribing officials in the education and healthy ministry with some students paying triple the tuition fees for enrollment.

Dr. Govinda KC is a staunch supporter of medical education reform in Nepal and has long advocated to break the education "mafia" present in the system.

Engineering colleges
Engineering colleges also exist throughout Nepal, with most admitting local students through an entrance exam. Like the country's medical colleges, foreign students are admitted after an interview. To be eligible for admission to Nepalese engineering colleges, candidates are encouraged to pass the Intermediate in Science or have a diploma in engineering (or its equivalent).

The Institute of Engineering of Tribhuvan University is the country's oldest engineering school. It has four colleges, and 13 private engineering colleges are affiliated with it. The IOE's central campus (Pulchowk Campus) as well as Kathmandu university school of engineering are considered to be the best engineering college in Nepal. Pulchowk offers bachelor's, master's and PhD degrees in engineering.  More than 16,000 students from around the world take the school's entrance examination.

Nepal Engineering College (NEC) in Changunarayan is the country's first private engineering college to offer bachelor's- and master's-level courses. Popular engineering fields in Nepal are architecture, civil engineering, computer engineering, electronics and communications, electrical and electronics, energy and rural engineering. The B.E. architecture courses take five years to complete, and other bachelor's-degree courses take four years.

Study abroad
Nepal ranks 11th in countries of origin for international students in the United States. According to "Open Doors 2009", the annual report on international academic mobility published by the Institute of International Education with support from the Bureau of Educational and Cultural Affairs of the United States Department of State, the number of Nepali students enrolled in U.S. institutions of higher education increased from 8,936 in the 2007–08 academic year to 11,581 in 2008–09 (a 29.6-percent increase). In the 2006–07 academic year, Nepal ranked 13th among countries of origin of international students.

According to Terry J. White, counselor for public affairs at the U.S. Embassy in Kathmandu, "America's nearly 3,000 accredited schools of higher education continue to attract new students in what is becoming a highly competitive international 'market' around the world." The U.S. is the preferred destination for students from Nepal who want to study abroad because of the quality and prestige associated with an American degree. Another contributing factor is access to comprehensive, accurate information about study in the U.S. through EducationUSA offices in Nepal and increased activity by United States colleges and universities to attract students from Nepal. However, "a culture of disrespect" for humble Nepalese by U.S. Embassy staff has been reported by a co-founder of Nepali/American NGO, Possible Health.

See also
 Gender inequality in Nepal
 Human rights in Nepal
 List of schools in Nepal
 List of engineering colleges in Nepal (intake capacity of engineering colleges)
 List of universities and colleges in Nepal

References

External links
 Ministry of Education, Nepal
 World data on Education: Nepal, UNESCO-IBE(2010–2011) – Overview of the Nepalese education system
 Vocational education in Nepal, UNESCO-UNEVOC – Overview of the Nepalese vocational education system
 "Bringing the Poorest into Schools", World Bank (2009)
 – Report on higher education and TVET in Nepal, Asian Development Bank (2016)